A grasshopper is a common type of herbivorous insect.

Grasshopper or grasshoppers may also refer to:

Companies 
 Martins Bank, or the Grasshopper (1730–1760), a private bank in London
 Grasshopper Manufacture, a video game company
 The Grasshopper Company, an American manufacturer of lawn mowers and related implements

Drinks 
 Grasshopper (cocktail)
 Grasshöpper Wheat Ale, produced by Big Rock Brewery

Films 
 The Grasshopper (1955 film), a Soviet drama
 The Grasshopper (1970 film), a drama starring Jacqueline Bisset and Jim Brown
 Grasshoppers (Cavallette), a 1990 short animated film
 Grasshopper (film), a 2015 Japanese thriller starring Toma Ikuta, Tadanobu Asano and Ryosuke Yamada

Literature
 Grasshopper (character), several characters in Marvel Comics
 Grasshopper (novel), by Barbara Vine (Ruth Rendell)
 "The Grasshopper" (short story), 1892, by Anton Chekhov

Military 
 
 Grasshopper (robot weather station), developed by the US Air Force and Navy in the 1950s and deployed by parachute
 Grasshopper cannon, a British infantry weapon designed in the 18th century
 Slingsby Grasshopper, a British Royal Air Force training glider
 Taylorcraft L-2 or Grasshopper, an American military aircraft
 Aeronca L-3 or Grasshopper, an American military aircraft
 Piper L-4 or Grasshopper, a military version of the Piper J-3 Cub
 Stinson L-13 or Grasshopper, an American military aircraft

Music 
 Grasshopper (band), a Cantopop group from Hong Kong
 Grasshopper (musician) (born 1967), American, with the band Mercury Rev
 Grasshopper (album), by J. J. Cale
 Grasshopper (EP), by British band Ride

Songs
 "The Grasshoppers" (song), by the South Korean group Sunny Hill
 "Grasshopper" (song), a J. J. Cale song off the album Grasshopper (album)
 "Grasshopper" (song), a Ride song off the album Going Blank Again

Places 
 Grasshopper, Arizona, a populated place
 Grasshopper Township, Atchison County, Kansas
 Delaware River (Kansas), or Grasshopper River
 Grasshopper Glacier (Montana)
 Grasshopper Glacier (Wyoming)

Sports 
 The Grasshopper (horse) (foaled c. 1945), a competitor in the sport of eventing
 Grasshopper Club Zürich, a Swiss association football club
 Grasshopper Club Zürich (women), the women's team
 Grasshoppers F.C., a defunct association football club from Bonnybridge, Scotland
 Birmingham Grasshoppers, a defunct soccer team from Alabama, United States
 Greensboro Grasshoppers, a minor league baseball team in North Carolina, United States
 Preston Grasshoppers R.F.C., a rugby union team from Preston, England
 Grasshopper Women's Masters, a women's World Curling Tour event

Vehicles 
 Ikarus Grasshopper, a German hang glider design
 Sopwith Grasshopper, a British two-seat touring biplane
 XO-63 Grasshopper and L6A Grasshopper, variants of the Interstate Cadet light aircraft
 Atlantic (locomotive), nicknamed Grasshopper
 SpaceX Grasshopper, a Falcon 9 prototype

Other uses 
 Grasshopper (chess piece), used in grasshopper chess
 Grasshopper (sculpture), 1988, by Wayne Chabre in Salem, Oregon, United States
 Grasshopper (software), a framework to allow the use of Visual Basic and C# on a Java Application Server
 Operation Grasshopper, a project to look for natural resources in Suriname from the air
 Grasshopper beam engine, a variant where the beam is pivoted at one end, rather than in the centre
 Grasshopper escapement, a mechanical component of a clock
 Grasshopper 3D, a visual programming language that runs within the Rhinoceros 3D CAD application
 Grasshopper Scouts, a Hong Kong scouting organization for 6- to 8-year-old children
 Grasshopper or Kwai Chang Caine, a character in the TV series Kung Fu

See also 
 Grasshopper chess, a chess variant
 Heuschrecke 10 (English: Grasshopper 10), a German World War II prototype self-propelled gun
 HMS Grasshopper, any of several ships
 Jim Whitney (1857–1891), baseball pitcher nicknamed "Grasshopper Jim"